Sabine Dähne (born 27 February 1950) is a German rower who competed for East Germany in the 1976 Summer Olympics.

She was born in Colditz. In 1976 she and her partner Angelika Noack won the silver medal in the coxless pair event.

References

External links 
 

1950 births
Living people
People from Colditz
East German female rowers
Sportspeople from Saxony
Olympic rowers of East Germany
Rowers at the 1976 Summer Olympics
Olympic silver medalists for East Germany
Olympic medalists in rowing
World Rowing Championships medalists for East Germany
Medalists at the 1976 Summer Olympics
Recipients of the Patriotic Order of Merit in bronze
European Rowing Championships medalists